Richard Antony Varvill (born 23 September 1961) is a British engineer, and the Chief Designer (Technical Director) at Reaction Engines Limited.

Early life
He was born in Hammersmith in west London. He is the son of Mark Varvill, a naval architect, and Elizabeth Agar, and has a younger sister. His great-great-great-great grandfather on his mother's side is Hucks Gibbs, 1st Baron Aldenham.

He was educated at Belmont Preparatory School at Holmbury St Mary in the Surrey Hills AONB, then Bryanston School in Dorset. He read Mechanical Engineering at the University of Bristol, where he did an undergraduate apprenticeship at Rolls-Royce. Reaction Engines offer an annual prize at the Department of Aerospace Engineering at Bristol.

Career

Rolls-Royce
He started his career with Rolls-Royce Military Engine Division, in the Advanced Projects division. He worked on preliminary ideas for what could have become the RB545 air-breathing rocket engine for HOTOL.

Reaction Engines
He co-founded Reaction Engines in 1989.

At Reaction Engines, he is working on the successor to the RB545, SABRE (rocket engine). On 22 May 2014 he appeared in an edition of Horizon, called The £10 Million Challenge.

Personal life
He first married Julie O'Brien in December 1998. They have a son (born March 1999). He later married Marianne Suhr, having two sons. He lives in the Vale of White Horse in Oxfordshire.

References

External links
 
 2009 interview
 The Three Rocketeers on BBC Four in September 2012
 C-Fly

1961 births
Alumni of the University of Bristol
British mechanical engineers
People educated at Bryanston School
People from Hammersmith
People from Vale of White Horse (district)
Rocket scientists
Rolls-Royce people
Space programme of the United Kingdom
Living people